The A533 road or the Bridgewater Expressway is a road linking Rode Heath in Cheshire, England with Widnes, also in Cheshire.

Route
The road follows this route:

Rode Heath
Sandbach
Middlewich
Northwich
Runcorn
Widnes

Primary route status
The road is a primary route between Middlewich and Runcorn.  The route also covers the Silver Jubilee Bridge.

References 

Roads in England
Roads in Cheshire